Vytautas Kernagis (May 19, 1951 – March 15, 2008) was a Lithuanian singer-songwriter, bard, actor, director, and television announcer. He is considered a pioneer of Lithuanian sung poetry.

Career 

He attended M.K.Čiurlionis school (first 3 years) and Vilnius 23rd school. In 1973 he graduated from the Lithuanian Academy of Music and Theatre.
 
He was a member of the pioneering Lithuanian big beat bands Aisčiai (1966–1968) and Rupūs miltai (1969–1972).

Kernagis recorded his first album of sung poetry in 1978. Kernagis also took part in the first Lithuanian rock opera Devil's Bride, first Lithuanian musical Ugnies medžioklė su varovais (1976), and first Lithuanian musical for a puppet theatre Šokantis ir dainuojantis mergaitės vieversėlis.

Kernagis hosted the 1st season (2007) of Žvaigždžių duetai TV show.

Kernagis suffered from gastric cancer and died March 15, 2008. He was cremated and interred in the Antakalnis Cemetery in Vilnius.

Filmography

Kai aš mažas buvau (When I was little) (1968)
Mažoji išpažintis (Little confession) (1971)
Atsiprašau  (I'm sorry) (1982)
Kažkas atsitiko (Something happened) (1986)
Anastasija  (Anastasia) (2006)

Discography 
 Akustinis (1978 LP album, 1994 CD ir MC, 2006, Vilniaus plokštelių studija)
 Baltojo nieko dainelės (1979, Vilniaus plokštelių studija; 2000, „"Čiki Piki")
 Vytautas Kernagis (1979 LP, Melodia C60-10889-90)
 Kabaretas „Tarp girnų" (1982 small vinyl, 1984 LP, Vilniaus plokštelių studija)
 Vytautas Kernagis Čikagoje (1985, Cassettes studija)
 Dainos teatras:
 Žvilgsnis nuo kalno (1986, Vilniaus plokštelių studija)
 Eik savo keliu (1987, Vilniaus plokštelių studija)
 Povo link... (1989, Vilniaus plokštelių studija)
 Apie medžioklę (1990, Vilniaus plokštelių studija)
 Keistumas (1991 m., "Lituanus")
 Dainos teatras – Abėcėlė (1993, "Bomba")
 Vaikai vanagai (1994, "Bomba")
 Kabaretas „Tarp girnų“ 1979–1994 (1994 m., "Bomba")
 Baltas paukštis (1998, Vilniaus plokštelių studija)
 Teisingos dainos (2003, "Tigris")
 Dainos teatras (2006)
 Klasika (2007, 5 CD collection):
 Akustinis
 Baltojo nieko dainelės
 Dainos teatras
 Teisingos dainos

Awards and remembrance
 1995 – Antanas Šabaniauskas' music award
 2000 – 
 2002 – Officer's Cross of the Order of the Lithuanian Grand Duke Gediminas
 2008 – Lithuanian National Prize for Culture and Arts, for the professionalism in modern creativity and artistry.

A bench sculpture in Nida by 

A sculpture to his song in Marijampole.

A sculpture bench with a guitar by Gediminas Avenue, Vilnius

References

External links
 Vytautas Kernagis Fund

Burials at Antakalnis Cemetery
1951 births
2008 deaths
Deaths from stomach cancer
Deaths from cancer in Lithuania
Recipients of the Lithuanian National Prize
Officer's Crosses of the Order of the Lithuanian Grand Duke Gediminas
Lithuanian songwriters
Lithuanian pop musicians
Lithuanian television presenters
Musicians from Vilnius
Lithuanian Academy of Music and Theatre alumni
21st-century Lithuanian politicians
20th-century Lithuanian writers
20th-century Lithuanian male singers
21st-century Lithuanian writers
21st-century Lithuanian male singers